The Artists' General Benevolent Institution is a British charity assisting professional artists in England, Wales and Northern Ireland who are in financial difficulty due to illness, old age or accident. It was founded in 1814 by members of the Royal Academy of Arts including J. M. W. Turner, John Constable and John Soane. Incorporated by Royal Charter in 1842, it is one of the oldest charities in the United Kingdom.

The AGBI financially supports professional artists in need and their dependents living in England, Wales or Northern Ireland who cannot work or earn an income due to accident, illness or old age. The AGBI is run by a Council of mostly practicing artists, applied artists, art custodians and medical professionals who give their time for free and who meet regularly to discuss cases of need. The AGBI is based in Burlington House, Piccadilly, London.

External links

Charities based in London
Organizations established in 1814
Organisations based in London with royal patronage
1814 establishments in the United Kingdom
Arts organizations established in the 1810s